Story Time or Storytime may refer to:

Story Time (novel), a satirical young adult novel by Edward Bloor
Storytime (film), a short animated comedy film written, directed and animated by Terry Gilliam
"Storytime" (song), a song by the Finnish symphonic metal band Nightwish
Storytime (TV programme), a British children's television programme which aired on BBC Two from 1987 to 1997 
Kino's Storytime, an American television program which aired on PBS from 1992 to 1997
Scary Story Time (podcast), a podcast told by horror author Spooky Boo Rhodes
Story Time (sculpture), a sculpture of children reading, in Corvallis, Oregon, United States
Story Teller (magazine), a magazine partwork published by Marshall Cavendish, sold as Story Time in Australia and New Zealand

See also
 Story (disambiguation)
 Time (disambiguation)